Suzanne Lenglen defeated Mary Kendall Browne 6–1, 6–0 in the final to win the women's singles tennis title at the 1926 French Championships. Lenglen dropped four games in her five matches.

Seeds
The seeded players are listed below. Suzanne Lenglen is the champion; others show the round in which they were eliminated.

 Suzanne Lenglen (champion)
 Helen Wills (second round)
 Mary Kendall Browne (final)
 Elizabeth Ryan (quarterfinals)
 Joan Fry Lakeman (semifinals)
 Kathleen McKane Godfree (quarterfinals)
 Diddie Vlasto (first round)
 Yvonne Bourgeois (first round)

Draw

Key
 Q = Qualifier
 WC = Wild card
 LL = Lucky loser
 r = Retired

Finals

Earlier rounds

Section 1

Section 2

References

External links

1926 in women's tennis
1926
1926 in French women's sport
1926 in French tennis